East Springfield Union School, also known as Springfield Central School, is a historic school building located at East Springfield in Otsego County, New York. It was built in two stages, starting in 1909.  The original front section is a two-story, "T" plan, cross gabled Neoclassical style building executed in rusticated concrete block and set on a half raised basement. The rear portion is a single story utilitarian concrete block structure built in 1936. The main facade includes a protruding, full height central gable, its pediment featuring an Adamesque lunette window, fishscale slates, and a heavy wood cornice.  The school closed in 1989.

It was listed on the National Register of Historic Places in 1996.

References

School buildings on the National Register of Historic Places in New York (state)
Neoclassical architecture in New York (state)
School buildings completed in 1909
Schools in Otsego County, New York
National Register of Historic Places in Otsego County, New York
1909 establishments in New York (state)